Edward Rueben "Earl" Wren (September 19, 1893 – August 11, 1932) was an American football player and coach. He served as the head football coach at Jacksonville State Normal School—now known as Jacksonville State University—in 1925, compiling a record of 1–6. Wren played college football at Auburn University from 1915 to 1916 and was awarded the Distinguished Service Cross for his service in World War I. Before and after his time at Jacksonville State, he served as a high school football coach at a number of schools in the state of Alabama.

References

External links
 

1893 births
1932 deaths
American football fullbacks
Auburn Tigers football players
Jacksonville State Gamecocks football coaches
High school football coaches in Alabama
United States Army personnel of World War I
Recipients of the Distinguished Service Cross (United States)
United States Army non-commissioned officers